Demetris Leoni (born January 13, 1977, in Limassol, Cyprus) is a Cypriot retired goalkeeper and goalkeeping coach of Omonia. He also played for AEL Limassol, Omonia, AEP, Alki Larnaca and APEP.

References

External links
 

1977 births
Living people
Association football goalkeepers
Cypriot footballers
Cyprus international footballers
AC Omonia players
AEL Limassol players
AEP Paphos FC players
Anorthosis Famagusta F.C. players
Alki Larnaca FC players
APEP FC players
Ayia Napa FC players
Pafos FC players
Cypriot First Division players
Cypriot Second Division players